Nergal-ushezib, originally Shuzub, was a Babylonian nobleman who was installed as King of Babylon by the Elamites in 694 BC, after their capture of Babylon and deposition and murder of the previous king Ashur-nadin-shumi, son of King Sennacherib of Assyria.

Nergal-ushezib reigned as King for little more than a year.  Sennacherib soon made war on Babylon to recover the city and avenge his son's death.  Nergal-ushezib was defeated and captured by the Assyrians in battle near Nippur in September 693 BC.  Nergal-ushezib's subsequent fate is unknown.  He was succeeded by the Chaldean prince Mushezib-Marduk, who continued the resistance against Assyria.

References 

693 BC deaths
7th-century BC Babylonian kings
Year of birth unknown